Below are the squads for the 2012 AFC Challenge Cup in Nepal, that took place between 8 and 19 March 2012. The players' listed age is their age on the tournament's opening day (8 March 2012).

Group A

Turkmenistan
Coach: Ýazguly Hojageldiýew

Maldives
Coach:  István Urbányi

Nepal
Coach:  Graham Roberts

Palestine
Coach:  Jamal Mahmoud

Group B

North Korea
Coach: Yun Jong-Su

Philippines
Coach:  Michael Weiß

India
Coach: Savio Medeira

Tajikistan
Coach:  Kemal Alispahić

References

AFC Challenge Cup squads
Squads